This is a list of notable egg dishes and beverages. Eggs are laid by females of many different species, including birds, reptiles, amphibians, and fish, and have been eaten by humans for thousands of years. Bird and reptile eggs consist of albumen (egg white) and vitellus (egg yolk), contained within many different thin membranes all surrounded by a protective eggshell. 

Popular choices for egg consumption are chicken, duck, quail, roe, caviar, and emu. The chicken egg is the egg most often consumed by humans.

Egg dishes

Egg drinks

See also

 Egg as food
 List of egg topics
 List of brunch foods
 List of custard desserts

References

Egg dishes
Egg dishes
Egg dishes